NKI can refer to:
Nathan Kline Institute for Psychiatric Research
Early name for Nash Metropolitan
Nederlands Kanker Instituut, Dutch Cancer research institute
The IATA code for Naukati Bay Seaplane Base